Arthur Joseph Munby (19 August 1828 – 29 January 1910) was a British diarist, poet, portrait photographer, barrister and solicitor. He is also known by his initials, A. J. Munby.

Munby in Victorian Society
The Victorian Era (1837-1901) was a period of great social change. Historian Leonore Davidoff writes that "The nineteenth century was the time when traditional social boundaries were being eclipsed by the rapid development of a market economy and the creation of a 'class' society". Social norms and boundaries were being redefined by the emerging Middle (Upper) class, which had the resources and time to formulate and propagate new social norms and rituals, and determine what was acceptable behavior and what was taboo. Victorian norms around sexuality insisted on the physical separation of male and female bodily functions and sexual acts from the public sphere. As class divisions were exacerbated by the growth of capitalism and industrialization, class designations began to take on gendered undertones. Ideas like manhood and womanhood were introduced to greater Victorian society, and manhood was tied to financial independence and participation in the imperial economy.

According to a scholarly analysis society was seen as hierarchical, with gender playing an important role in said hierarchy. Women were seen as subordinate to men, and it is argued Victorian male identity was tied around maintaining control of this hierarchy in both the private and public spheres. Arthur Munby’s relationship with Hannah Cullwick revolved around redefining the established sexual and social norms of Victorian Britain. Their relationship also pushed the social boundaries surrounding race and empire by engaging via Cullwick’s racial crossdressing. The transgressions of sexuality in the public and private spheres, and the intermingling of different socio-economic classes, offered Munby and Cullwick the chance to exercise agency and control over the rigid norms of Victorian society.

Biography
Arthur Munby was born in York. He was educated at Trinity College, Cambridge, graduating with a BA in 1851, and was called to the Bar from Lincoln's Inn in 1855. Munby became a barrister per the wishes of his father, as well as fulfilling his role as the eldest son in his family. He worked as a civil servant in the Ecclesiastical Commissioners' office from 1858 until his retirement in 1888. His published poetry included Benoni (1852) and Verses New and Old (1865). He taught Latin at the Working Men's College for more than a decade and helped promote the Working Men's College Volunteer Corps, a response to the national call for Volunteer Rifle Corps (1859) to combat a perceived war threat from Napoleon III. Munby penned verses of support, the Invicta: a Song of 1860, for the 19th Middlesex Regiment, a regiment to which the W.M.C.V.C. was attached. In 1864, a sister Working Women's College was established; Munby was a leading spirit of, and teacher at, the new college.

Munby had an interest in working-class women, particularly those who performed hard physical labour. A pastime was wandering the streets of London and other industrial cities where he approached working women to ask about their lives and the details of their work, while noting their clothes and dialects. The observations were recorded in his journals. These journals explore what Munby practiced with his wife, Hannah Cullwick, as well as his desire for the strength and care of a working woman.

He was an amateur artist, and his diaries contain sketches of working women. He collected hundreds of photographs, such as women who worked at collieries, kitchen maids, milkmaids, charwomen, and acrobats. His diaries and images provide historical information on the lives of working-class Victorian women. Much of his interest is alluded to in his last book, Faithful Servants: being epitaphs and obituaries recording their names and services (1891).

His papers are housed at Trinity College, Cambridge, there is a list of his papers on the Cambridge Janus website

Hannah Cullwick 
In 1854 Munby met Hannah Cullwick, a Shropshire-born maid-of-all-work and diarist. They formed a relationship in which Munby was the master, whom Cullwick addressed as 'massa', and Cullwick the slave, with him training her in the virtues of hard work and loyalty. However, Cullwick used this master/slave dynamic to prove her own worth outside of Munby and put herself in a place of power. For example, she used the slave band Munby gave her to display the fact that she was a working-class woman, and that she was not ashamed of it; this can be seen in Cullwick’s journal when she says "my hands and arms are tho' chief to me, to get my living with." Hannah Cullwick gave Munby the opportunity to explore the contrast between woman and man, hardy and delicate, as well as cross-class fluidity that was taboo in Victorian Society.

Other fetish scenarios between the couple which place Cullwick in the dominant role included elements of ageplay and infantilism, with Cullwick holding him in her lap or carrying him.

Further evidence of Cullwick as a dominant force in the couple’s relationship can be seen in Cullwick’s occupation. At one point in Munby’s journal, he depicts a time where he visits Cullwick at her workplace where she is actually a servant instead of just playing one. He says, "But to see her stand in a drawing room in her servant’s dress and know that she is a servant and that the piano, the books, the pictures belong to her mistress… this I could not endure".

They married secretly in 1873 but Cullwick resisted his efforts to make her into a lady and she lived with him as a domestic servant, not a wife. She played the role of a lady wife on trips to Europe. They separated in 1877, but continued to see each other until Cullwick's death in 1909. From 1887 onwards, the couple rented a cottage in the Shropshire village of Hadley, and they regularly spent time together. In 1903, they moved to Wyke Place in Shifnal, just a few metres from the house where she was born. The landlord was her brother Jim Cullwick. The marriage was secret from all but a few close friends; he revealed it to his brother only a few months before his own death from pneumonia in Pyrford, Surrey.

References

Further reading 

 Flanders, Judith; Inside the Victorian Home: A Portrait of Domestic Life in Victorian England. New York: W. W. Norton, 2004
 Atkinson, Diane; Love and Dirt: The Marriage of Arthur Munby and Hannah Cullwick. New York: Macmillan, 2003
 Reay, Barry; Watching Hannah: Sexuality, Horror and Bodily De-formation in Victorian England. Reaktion, 2002.
 Hudson, Derek; Munby: Man of Two Worlds. Gambit, 1972.
 Hiley, Michael; Victorian Working Women: Portraits from Life. Gordon Fraser, 1979

Portrait photographers
Alumni of Trinity College, Cambridge
English diarists
English educational theorists
English civil servants
English barristers
English solicitors
1828 births
1910 deaths
British diarists
English male poets
English male non-fiction writers
19th-century English lawyers